Alain Raymond (born June 24, 1965) is a Canadian former professional ice hockey goaltender. He played one game in the National Hockey League with the Washington Capitals, giving up two goals in the two periods that he played. He played most of his career in the North American minor leagues.

In his first full IHL season with the Fort Wayne Komets, Raymond won the James Norris Memorial Trophy, awarded to the goaltenders with the fewest goals against in the regular season.

Raymond split most of his time during the 1989–90 season between two clubs. He played 31 games with the ECHL's  Hampton Roads Admirals and played another 11 games with their parent club, the AHL's Baltimore Skipjacks. Raymond went 17–12–1 with a 3.60 GAA, earning him named the starting goalie on the East Coast Hockey League's all-star team.

Raymond later became a goaltender coach with the Rimouski Oceanic of the QMJHL.

See also
List of players who played only one game in the NHL

References

External links

1965 births
Living people
Baltimore Skipjacks players
Fort Wayne Komets players
Hampton Roads Admirals players
Nashville Knights players
People from Rimouski
Peoria Rivermen (IHL) players
Washington Capitals draft picks
Washington Capitals players
Canadian ice hockey goaltenders